MS Berge Vanga was an ore-bulk-oil carrier with .  The ship was owned by Norwegian shipping company Sig. Bergesen d.y. and registered in Liberia. The ship had build number 300 at the Uljanik shipyard in the port city Pula in Croatia where it was built in 1974.

The ship was en route from Brazil to Japan with iron ore when contact was lost with the vessel in the South Atlantic from 29 October 1979. The ship vanished and the ensuing search operation yielded no results. Forty people lost their lives.

Some debris that resembles parts from the tanker was found northwest of Tristan da Cunha island, but no traces of the crew. Still very little is known about the disaster, and the hearing after the accident was held behind closed doors. The principal theory holds that the cause could have been explosions caused by oil residue in the cargo compartments. MS Berge Vanga was, like its sister ship  which exploded and sank four years earlier with the loss of all but two of her crew, a ship which could transport both oil and iron ore.

References

External links
 
 

Merchant ships of Norway
Shipwrecks in the Atlantic Ocean
Maritime incidents in 1979
Missing ships
Ships lost with all hands
Ships built in Yugoslavia
Ships sunk by non-combat internal explosions